was a Japanese pole vaulter who won gold medals at the 1951 and 1954 Asian Games. He placed sixth at the 1952 Summer Olympics, where he served as the flag bearer for Japan.

References

1920 births
2006 deaths
Japanese male pole vaulters
Olympic male pole vaulters
Olympic athletes of Japan
Athletes (track and field) at the 1952 Summer Olympics
Asian Games gold medalists for Japan
Asian Games silver medalists for Japan
Asian Games gold medalists in athletics (track and field)
Asian Games medalists in athletics (track and field)
Athletes (track and field) at the 1951 Asian Games
Athletes (track and field) at the 1954 Asian Games
Medalists at the 1951 Asian Games
Medalists at the 1954 Asian Games
Japan Championships in Athletics winners